Lesticus politocollis is a species of ground beetle in the subfamily Pterostichinae. It was described by Victor Motschulsky in 1865.

References

Lesticus
Beetles described in 1865